The EMD F7 is a model of  diesel-electric locomotive produced between February 1949 and December 1953 by the Electro-Motive Division of General Motors (EMD) and General Motors Diesel (GMD).

Although originally promoted by EMD as a freight-hauling unit, the F7 was also used in passenger service hauling such trains as the Santa Fe Railway's Super Chief, & El Capitan and Ontario Northland's Northlander.

History 
The F7 was the fourth model in GM-EMD's successful line of F-unit locomotives, and by far the best-selling cab unit of all time. In fact, more F7s were built than all other F-units combined. The F7 succeeded the F3 model in GM-EMD's F-unit series, and was replaced in turn by the F9. Final assembly was at GM-EMD's La Grange, Illinois, plant or GMD's London, Ontario, facility. There was no F4, -5 or -6 model; "7" was chosen to match the contemporary twin-engine E7, and was also applied to the new GP7 road-switcher.

The F7 differed from the F3 primarily in internal equipment—mostly electrical—and some external features.

A total of 2,393 cab-equipped lead A units and 1,463 cabless-booster or B units were built.

Many F7s remained in service for decades, as railroads found them economical to operate and maintain. However, the locomotive was not very popular with yard crews who operated them in switching service because they were difficult to mount and dismount, and it was also nearly impossible for the engineer to see hand signals from a ground crew without leaning way outside the window. As most of these engines were bought and operated before two-way radio became standard on most American railroads, this was a major point of contention. In later years, with the advent of the "road switchers" such as the EMD GP7, F-units were primarily used in "through freight" and "unit train" service where there was little or no switching to be done.

Engine and powertrain 
The F7's prime mover is a 16-cylinder 567B series diesel engine developing  at 800 rpm. EMD has built all of its major components since 1939.
Starting in August 1953 EMD installed 567BC and 567C engines in a few F7s, see roster below.

Identification 
There are no easily identifiable differences between late F3 production and early F7 production; the major differences were all internal electrical system changes. However, no F7 had the "chicken wire" grilles seen on most F3s, and no F3s had later F7 changes described below under Phases.

The F9 is distinguishable from the late F7 by having five, rather than four, carbody center louver groups covering the carbody filters. The additional one is placed ahead of the first porthole, where F7s have no openings. The F9's greater power output, of course, cannot be seen from the outside.

There were also two main classes of F7s: passenger and freight. Most passenger units had upper and lower headlights, but there were exceptions. Many freight units had the upper Mars or Pyle brand warning light as well. And some passenger units only had a single upper headlight, i.e. the Pennsylvania. Many units eventually had the upper lights or the door light removed/plated over and the Mars/Pyle light removed. These early warning lights had a motor and linkages that often required maintenance in the shops.

Original buyers

Locomotives built by Electro-Motive Division, USA

Locomotives built by General Motors Diesel, Canada

Export locomotives built by Electro-Motive Division, USA for Mexico

Rebuilds 

Several F7s were rebuilt by Morrison–Knudsen as F9PHs and used in passenger operations. Others were rebuilt as the "FP10" and used by the Massachusetts Bay Transportation Authority for their commuter rail service. In addition, the Santa Fe had 190 of their F7As rebuilt into CF7 hood units in the 1970s. Only one original F7 unit from the railway exists to this day.

In the early 2000s, a single unpowered EMD F cab unit #7100 (ex-Baltimore & Ohio Railroad F7 #4553) operated on MARC, occasionally substituting for a cab car. In addition to serving as an all-purpose control unit, it also had a head-end power generator that supplied electricity to the train.

Surviving units 

Several F7s survive today, mostly in museums and tourist railroads.
The Norfolk Southern Railway previously rostered four F7 units (two A units and two B units), all which were rebuilt in 2007. The two A units were rebuilt into F9PH units, and rebuilt again into F9A units. They were used on inspection trains and Office Car Specials until 2019, when NS sold the four units. Two of them were sent to the Aberdeen, Carolina and Western Railway, while the other two were sent to the Reading Blue Mountain and Northern Railroad.
The Escanaba and Lake Superior Railroad (as of October 2011) operates an FP7A (#600) in main line freight service. The unit is the former Milwaukee Road #96A, and was purchased in 2005 from the Wisconsin and Southern Railroad.
The California State Railroad Museum in Sacramento, California, has three F7s.
Western Pacific F7A 913: This engine is currently listed as serviceable.
Atchison, Topeka & Santa Fe No. 347C GM-EMD 1949 F7A was given as a gift to the museum by Santa Fe in March 1986 and is repainted to original warbonnet colors. Currently inoperable.
Southern Pacific No. 6402 GM-EMD 1952 F7A was also given as a gift by the Pacific Coast Chapter of the Railroad and Historical Society in June 1978. Part of the locomotive has since been cutaway to display the inner workings of a diesel locomotive.
The Don Rhodes Mining and Transport Museum at Port Hedland, Western Australia, has a former Western Pacific Railroad F7A: 923A. It was sold to Mt. Newman Mining and operated as locomotive #5451 before being transferred to the Shire of Port Hedland. It is now a static display, with the prime mover removed.
The Galveston Railroad Museum owned F7As Texas Limited #100 (ex-Southern Pacific #6379) and #200 (ex-Southern Pacific #6309). This duo headed the "Texas Limited" passenger train which made runs to and from Houston until track speed restrictions and liability insurance costs ended operations.  Both units were scrapped in 2011 after extensive damage resulting from being submerged in saltwater after Hurricane Ike. The museum now owns 2 more F7's, #315 and #316, which are both painted in ATSF warbonnet colors. Both units are ex-Southern Pacific, #'s 6443 (315) and 365 (316); they have parts salvaged from the Texas Limited units.
Ex-Chicago and North Western Railway No. 401, formerly one of the C&NW’s executive train units in the 1980s, was donated by the Union Pacific Railroad to the Boone and Scenic Valley Railroad, which plans to restore the locomotive to operation. It arrived on the railroad on March 10, 2023.

See also 

EMD FP7
NOHAB
List of GM-EMD locomotives
List of GMD Locomotives

Notes

References 
 Burns, A. (n.d.). EMD F7 locomotives. American-Rails. Retrieved November 22, 2021, from https://www.american-rails.com/e1074.html.
 
 
 Hawkins, R. W. (2020, November 27). Southern Railway CabUnits. HawkinsRails. Retrieved November 22, 2021, from http://hawkinsrails.net/mainlines/sou/sou_mp_cabs.htm.
 
 
 
 
 
 
 
 
 
 
 Rio Grande Modelling and Historical Society. DRGW EMD F7 Roster. D&RGW F7 diesel roster. Retrieved November 22, 2021, from https://www.rgmhs.org/data/diesels/f7.html.
 The Diesel Shop. EMD F7A and F7B. EMD F7 Data Sheet. Retrieved November 22, 2021, from https://www.thedieselshop.us/Data%20EMD%20F7.HTML.
 
 General Motors Electro-Motive Division Service Department "Locomotive Reference Data" published January 1, 1959, 286 pages.
 General Motors of Canada Limited Diesel Division "Serial Number Record" 1942–1990, includes import of EMD units to Canada, 230 pages.

External links 

B-B locomotives
F07
F07
Diesel-electric locomotives of the United States
Railway locomotives introduced in 1949
Locomotives with cabless variants
Standard gauge locomotives of the United States
Passenger locomotives
Standard gauge locomotives of Canada
Standard gauge locomotives of Mexico
Diesel-electric locomotives of Canada
Diesel-electric locomotives of Mexico
Streamlined diesel locomotives